Indite is an extremely rare indium-iron sulfide mineral, found in Siberia. Its chemical formula is FeIn2S4.

It occurs as replacement of cassiterite in hydrothermal deposits. It is associated with dzhalindite, cassiterite and quartz. It was first described in 1963 for an occurrence in the Dzhalinda tin deposit, Malyi Khingan Range, Khabarovskiy Kray, Far-Eastern Region, Russia.

References

Emsley, John. Nature's Building Blocks. Oxford, 2001. 

Thiospinel group
Iron(II) minerals
Indium minerals
Cubic minerals
Minerals in space group 227
Minerals described in 1963